Curtis Yebli (born 30 March 1997) is a French football player. He plays for Ermis Aradippou FC.

Club career
He made his Serie B debut for Bari on 6 May 2017 in a game against Avellino.

On 29 July 2019 Yebli joined Cypriot club Ermis Aradippou FC.

References

External links
 

1997 births
People from Évry, Essonne
Living people
French footballers
French expatriate footballers
S.S.C. Bari players
S.S. Arezzo players
FC Arsenal Kyiv players
Ermis Aradippou FC players
Championnat National 3 players
Serie B players
Serie C players
Ukrainian Premier League players
Association football midfielders
Footballers from Essonne
Expatriate footballers in Italy
Expatriate footballers in Ukraine
Expatriate footballers in Cyprus
French expatriate sportspeople in Italy
French expatriate sportspeople in Ukraine
French expatriate sportspeople in Cyprus